Square Deal is a tile game, where players are trying to empty their hand of tiles by playing them before their opponent.  It was published by Winning Moves Games USA in 2008 and is the second of three games in their Brain-Ade line of quick puzzle games and features two multiplayer and a solitaire version. This game is no longer in production.

Gameplay 
The goal of the game is to play all of the tiles in your hand before your opponent.  The game starts by shuffling the 25 square tiles (divided into four colored triangular sections) face down and each player drawing 12 tiles face down. This can also be done by placing 10 tiles face down. The remaining tile is placed face up between the players as a starting tile.  On each players' turn, they flip up a face down tile and attempt to place it so that:
1) The side(s) of the tiles it is being placed next to match color-wise
2) The tile is not outside of a 5x5 square imaginary grid, into which all tiles must be placed.  This grid is filled as players place tiles and the start tile need not be in the center of the grid.
If a player cannot place a tile, they leave it face up and can choose to place either a new tile or the face up one on their next turn.  Play until one player has played all their tiles.  That player wins.  In the event neither player can play any more of their tiles, the player with the least tiles left to play wins.

The Solitaire variant plays more like a puzzle, where the player attempts to place all the tiles into a 5x5 or 4x6 grid (wild tile is removed).

Board games introduced in 2008
Tile-based board games